Đàm Vĩnh Hưng  (born 2 October 1971), often referred to by his nickname  Mr. Dam is a Vietnamese singer. He won 2 Dedication awards and multiple awards in Vietnam. Besides pop, he also performed many pre-war songs, Trinh Cong Son's songs and golden music. He is one of the most highly paid singers in Vietnam, and some of his alleged statements have appeared in tabloids.

Early life

Dam Vinh Hung was born in ( Quảng Nam) in 1971.. His paternal grandmother was of  Hokkien ancestry, and he claims to have French ancestry from his paternal grandfather. His mother is from Quảng Nam. He also has one sibling. Dam began his musical career in 1996. Before pursuing singing career, he was a hair dresser.

When he was young, he studied at Secondary School Ngo Quyen and High School Nguyen Thuong Hien located in District Tan Binh, Ho Chi Minh City. He had a variety of jobs to make ends meet including hair dresser and backup singer in various music shows.

He joined the Young Singers Club at Culture Center of District 10 since 1991. After winning first prize at the singing contest which was held by Culture Company of District 10 to discover new talents in 1992, he started to pursue professional music career afterward. He self-learned piano and did research on vocal technique and performance style. In 1998, after competing eight times, he won the fourth prize of Ho Chi Minh City The Voice of Television Contest which used to be very famous back then. In 1999, he made to the Top 10 Potential Voices of Saigon Music Center among other 300 contestants.

He won The Most Excellent Singer prize in the contest which was held by Ben Thanh Theater's Young Audience Music Club from September 2000 – September 2001. This is considered to be the milestone of his career. His two songs Tình Ơi Xin Ngủ Yên (Please sleep tight my love) and Bình Minh Sẽ Mang Em Đi (The sunrise will take you away) which were well-known, and widely recognizable, became a remarkable milestone of his music career. At the beginning of his career, his unique raspy voice resembles Vietnamese-American singer Don Ho, and he often sang with very strong intonation at the end of each lyrics. Afterward, he chose to sing pre-war songs, romance songs and golden songs.

Apparently, beside being actively singing, he also owns an entertainment agency, a restaurant, some food brands, and being a coach of some TV reality music shows.

He doesn't mind publicly showing how rich he is, such as the incident of which he lost a billion worth of watches, three times losing diamonds, purchasing US$5 million penthouse and his billion worth of fashion collection.

He is a Christian.

Music ability 
According to him, in some music shows, he tend to sings many genres, which some of them are not his best, to entertain the audiences, because "If I don't try many genres, I won't be able to gain many fans and audiences, I won't be able to perform at plenty music shows. Meaning I'm able to sing different genres for being such a talented singer".

Music career

2003: Trái Tim Hát (A Singing Heart) 
Trái Tim Hát was his first liveshow. He released the album back in April 2003 with a 680 million (VND) budget. At that time, this budget was considered to be huge, showing his determination and devotion for his music career. The guests were Mỹ Tâm, Hồng Ngọc, Hiền Thục, MTV boyband. In the first liveshow, he performed his own famous songs with the guests such as: Say Tình (Drunk in Love), Lạc Mất Mùa Xuân (Lost the Spring), Cô Đơn Mình Anh (Lonely All By Myself), Góc Phố Rêu Xanh (Green Moss Corner)...For this liveshow, he established a strong foundation for his career.

2004: Giờ H (Hour H) 
After the success of the first live show, in 2004, due to audiences' support, he continued to hold the second live show named Giờ H (Hour H). Addressing his thought on the unique name of the liveshow, he explained: "Giờ H means my own hour, only me and music". The guests included Siu Black, Thanh Lam, Hồng Ngọc, Mỹ Tâm,... To prepare for three-night live show, he invited well-known people to be working on his live show such as director Huỳnh Phúc Điền, artist Le Trường Tiêu (stage designer), Hang Anh Duong (martial art group), ABC (dance group). Being one of the most famous stars at that time, he made Giờ H become another step to prove his own brand in Vietnam music industry.

2007: Thương Hoài Ngàn Năm (Loving for Million Years) 
At the end of July 2009, he held the third live show named Thương Hoài Ngàn Năm as a present for middle aged audiences. For this live show, he had a whole Quốc Thanh Theater under large scale innovation to adapt the vibe of songs from 70s, with great approval from Phước Sang. In order to match the vibe of these songs, he invited many artists such as: Hương Lan, Thai Chai, Phương Thanh, Xuân Phú, and Năm Dòng Kẻ group. With this live show, he captured attention from middle aged audiences who own very delicate taste. Ever since, he was known as King of Vietnam Music. Other than that, his name guarantees the quality of live shows made by himself.

2008: Dạ Tiệc Trắng (White Ball) 
Early morning of 2 October 2008, he set two records by holding his White Ball liveshow: the longest duration liveshow and the biggest number of guests dressing in white. This is not only his own record but in Vietnam generally. Mentioning Dam Vinh Hung's White Ball, everyone is reminded of the most luxurious liveshow of all time: the dresscode is white along with all white decoration in also white mansion. White Ball is the origin for color theme party trend later. Thus, by this liveshow, he also set the record of the singer who sings the most songs with 54 songs. The guests of the liveshow included Lệ Quyên, Hồng Ngọc, Thanh Thảo, Hồ Ngọc Hà, TV host Bình Minh. This unique liveshow marks his outstanding class among many singers in Vietnam.

2009: Người Tình (The Lover) 
Despite low selling ticket of other liveshows in 2009, Dam Vinh Hung's The Lover liveshow, on the other hand, was a success. Before the liveshow, many doubtfully questioned whether or not the liveshow would be doing great. However, he briefly shared: "I believe in my own brand name". With the guest appearance of Thanh Lam, Lệ Quyên, Hồng Ngọc, Hoài Linh, Cẩm Ly, Mỹ Lệ, Quang Dũng,...he brought an extraordinary music show to the audience across Vietnam.

2010: Vũ Khúc Mùa Đông (Winter Waltz) 
In 2010, Dam Vinh Hung's Winter Waltz liveshow  which was unofficially known as White Ball 2 greatly satisfied the audience. Working on winter theme, the audience were led into a romantic winter themed space on the night of 3 December 2010 at White Palace (Ho Chi Minh City) and together joined in a glamorous gown ball. Also in this liveshow, he officially announced the establishment of his charity foundation named "Mr. Dam va Em" which is contributed for children living under unfortunate conditions, children diagnosed with dangerous defects and children abandoned at hospitals.

2011: Mr. Dam by Night 5-Bước Chân Miền Trung (Mr. Dam by Night 5-Footprint on Middle Region) 
On 16 July 2011, Dam Vinh Hung and 30 artists officially launched an exclusive concert named Mr. Dam by Night 5-Footprint on Middle Region at Hoa Binh Theater. The special feature of this concert is all the featured artists are from Middle Region of Vietnam such as: actress Hồng Vân, Ánh Tuyết, Mỹ Lệ, Mỹ Tâm, Cẩm Ly, Quang Dũng, Hồ Ngọc Hà, Dương Triệu Vũ, Lê Cát Trọng Lý, Nguyên Thảo, Mỹ Hằng, Ngọc Anh, Hoàng Lê Vi,...

Five months since the release of CD Lost Love, on 26 July 2011, he released the album which was produced by himself. The theme of the album was Xót Xa belonged to his classical music project Dạ Khúc Cho Tình Nhân, including 14 long live songs from songwriters: Lam Phương, Châu Kỳ, Tô Thanh Tùng, Lê Trọng Nguyên, Hoàng Thanh Tâm, Trường Sa, Nguyên Vu,...presented by himself with the remix of Minh Mẫn, Anh Khoa, Vĩnh Tâm, Minh Vy,...The 5th album Xót Xa included many favorite songs by everyone such as: Xót Xa, Biển Tình, Ngưu Lang Chức Nữ, Mưa Thu Chức Nữ,...were performed by his smoothly passionate voice, along with other singers such as Lệ Quyên, Cẩm Ly, Hồng Ngọc and Hoài Lâm.

2012: Số Phận (Fate) – 15th Anniversary 
26 June 2012, he had a press release to introduce liveshow Fate – a liveshow to mark 15th anniversary of his singing career. In 21 and 22 July 2012, he officially launched the liveshow at Lan Anh Stage (Ho Chi Minh City) with the participation of Lệ Quyên, Cẩm Ly, Thu Minh, Dương Triệu Vũ, Kim Xuân, Tú Trinh, Ngoc Huyền, Hương Thảo. 28 July 2012, he performed at National Conference Center along with Cẩm Ly, Thu Minh, Mỹ Dung, Dương Triệu Vũ, Kim Xuân, Tú Trinh, Ngoc Huyền, Hương Thảo. 17 December 2012, he released the DVD of the liveshow including 31 performances in different genres.

2013: Xóa Tên Người Tình-Chờ Đông (Erasing The Name of The Lover – Awaiting for Winter) 
8 August 2013, he officially released the duo classical album from his long-term project Da Khuc Cho Tinh Nhan, the theme of these 2 albums are Xóa Tên Người Tình (Erasing the Name of the Lover) and Chờ Đông (Awaiting for Winter). Beside, 1,000 limited editions that were designed with velvety cover and golden imprint with a special booklet of the old Saigon was also released at the same time.

2014: Thương Hoài Ngàn Năm 2 (Loving for Million Years 2) 
18 March 2014, he released a pop album Tình Buồn Của H (Sad Love of H). The album included 8 songs which were composed by Minh Khang, Phú Quang, Nguyễn Hoàng Duy,...singer Dương Triệu Vũ was featured in the song Con Yêu.

15 October 2014, he continued to releasing a pop album named Làm Sao Anh Biết (How Do I Know?). The album included 10 songs composed by Phương Uyên, Hoàng Nhã, Nguyễn Minh Anh, Hồ Hoài Anh,... the lead single was composed by himself. Especially, the album was released in traditional way but in smart card method.

27 November 2014, the press release for his liveshow Thương Hoài Ngàn Năm 2 (Loving for Million Years 2) was held at Gem Center (Ho Chi Minh City) and JW Marriot Hotel; the ticket price ranged from 2 to 5 million (VND). However, according to the director's technical request, the liveshow location was moved from Gem Center to SECC Saigon. Liveshow had guest appearance of Bảo Yến, Lệ Quyên, Hồng Ngọc, Hồ Ngọc Hà, Phạm Thu Hà, Dương Triệu Vũ, Giang Hồng Ngọc, Quách Ngọc Ngoan. The 600mq stage was uniquely designed along with 3D technology. The liveshow Thương Hoài Ngàn Năm 2 made great attention back in 2007 which was directed by director Huỳnh Phúc Điền, it became a hit of his career. After 7 years, he finally held Thương Hoài Ngàn Năm 2 with the assistance of director Trần Vi Mỹ.

2015: Khác, Tình Ca Mùa Đông and Lời Con Dâng Chúa (Oppose, Winter Love Song & Prayers to God) 
3 November 2015, he released an album titled Khác (Oppose) included 5 songs composed by Trương Lê Sơn, Thái Thịnh, Duy Mạnh. 13 November 2015, another Christian themed album was released titled Lời Con Dâng Chúa (Prayers to God) at the local church in District 10, Ho Chi Minh City.

2016: Diamond Show
13 September 2016, he had a press release as the introduction for first project from a multiple project for his 20th anniversary named Diamond Show. 1 and 2 October 2016, he launched Diamond Show at Hoa Binh Theater. In the second night of Diamond Show, Le Quyen, Thanh Thao, Hong Ngoc, Ho Ngoc Ha together celebrated his birthday on stage. On 15 October 2016, he performed Diamond Show at National Conference Center in Ha Noi. Many artists and colleagues came to the show to support his show such as Le Quyen and husband, Vu Ha, Quach Tuan Du, Han Thai Tu, Miss Thu Hoai, Binh Minh and his wife, Trang Tran, Kim Cuong, actress Ngoc Thanh Tam, Hien Mai, La Quoc Hung, Gia Bao.

2017: Thần Tượng Bolero 2017, Sài Gòn Bolero & Hưng, Tình Bơ Vơ (Bolero Idol 2017, Sai Gon Bolero & Hung, Lonely Love) 
22 February 2017, he was confirmed to be the coach of the reality show Bolero Idol 2nd season, the rest of the judge were Ngọc Sơn, Lê Quyên and Quang Lê. In 15 episodes of the show, he recruited 8 excellent contestants for his team: Hellen Thuy, Hoàng Oanh, Chu Hoàng Tuấn, Trương Diễm, Hùng Cường, Võ Duy Thắng, Sỹ Hiếu and Văn Quốc. In the final show on 16 June 2017, one of his team member Hellen Thuy won the first prize of Bolero Idol 2017.

6 July 2017, he introduced his new project in a press release named Saigon Bolero & Hung. This was the second project from his 20th anniversary project. The liveshow was invested with more than 10 billion (VND) budget, it recreated the golden age of bolero – a music genres which was directed by director Trần Vi Mỹ. Hương Lan, Lệ Quyên, Quang Lê, Dương Triệu Vũ, Hoài Lâm and Thu Hằng Bolero were the guests of the liveshow. 5 August 2017, he performed at Hoa Binh Theater and another show at National Conference Center on 26 August 2017.

Beside that, on 15 August 2017, the 8th album named Tình Bơ Vơ (Lonely Love) from Dạ Khúc Cho Tình Nhân project was officially released. 20.000 copies were made for the first sale, as he shared though it wasn't officially distributed, 4.000 copies were already pre ordered in foreign countries. On 19 December 2017, he released the DVD of Saigon Bolero & Hung liveshow including 40 performances from the liveshow.

2018: Gương Măt Thân Quen, Giọng Ca Bất Bại, Tuyệt Đỉnh Song Ca (Familiar Face, Undefeatable Voice, Top Duet) 
17 April 2018, he held a press release at his own house to introduce a pop album, including 5 songs from the theme: Love to the Fullest, Hurt to the Fullest. The album included songs composed by Hung Quan. On 1 August 2018, he launched the music video title Hello at Van Hanh Mall, Ho Chi Minh City. The launch had guest appearance from Lệ Quyên, Quang Linh, Dương Triệu Vũ, Hồ Ngọc Hà, Quốc Thiên, Hương Giang Idol, God of Catwalk Simon and hundred audiences.

Albums

Pop albums 

 Vol. 1 – My Love Please Sleep Safe and Sound (Tình ơi xin ngủ yên) (2001)
 Vol. 2 – Sunset Will Take You Away (Bình minh sẽ mang em đi) (2001)
 Vol. 3 – Một trái tim tình si (2002)
 Vol. 4 – Bao giờ người trở lại... Hãy đến đây đêm nay (2002)
 Vol. 5 – Giọt nước mắt cho đời (2003)
 Vol. 6 – Hưng (2004)
 Vol. 7 – Mr. Đàm (2005)
 Vol. 8 – Tình ca hoài niệm (2006) với 12 tình khúc 1954 – 1975 nổi tiếng
 Vol. 9 – Giải thoát (2007)
 Vol. 10 – Lạc mất em (2007)
 Vol. 11 – Hạnh phúc cuối (2008)

Old music albums 

 Dạ khúc cho tình nhân 1 – Hạnh phúc lang thang (2008)
 Dạ khúc cho tình nhân 2 – Qua cơn mê (2008)
 Dạ khúc cho tình nhân 3 – Những bài ca không quên (2010)
 Dạ khúc cho tình nhân 4 – Cuộc tình đã mất (2011)
 Dạ khúc cho tình nhân 5 – Xót xa (2011)
 Dạ khúc cho tình nhân 6 – Xóa tên người tình (2013)
 Dạ khúc cho tình nhân 7 – Chờ đông (2013)
 Dạ khúc cho tình nhân 8 – Tình bơ vơ (2017)

Edited albums 

 Vùng trời bình yên – với Hồng Ngọc (2002) - Composed by : Hữu Tâm, Mr Đàm ft Dương Triệu Vũ
 Phôi pha (2003)
 Bước chân mùa xuân (2008)
 Mùa Noel đó (2009)
 Khoảng cách (2010)
 Sa mạc tình yêu – với Thanh Lam (2011)
 Anh còn nợ em (2011)
 Ca dao mẹ (2011)
 3H (2011)
 Góc khuất (2012)
 Tuổi hồng thơ ngây (2012)
 Chúc xuân – Bên em mùa xuân (2012)
 Tình buồn của H (2014)
 Làm sao anh biết (2014)
 Ô kìa... (2014)
 Khắc (2015)
 Lời con dâng chúa (2015)
 Tình ca mùa đông (2015)
 Tình không biên giới (2016)
 Yêu tận cùng, đau tận cùng (2018)
 Một mình có sao đâu (2018)

Video albums 

 Liveshow Trái tim hát (2003)
 Liveshow Giờ H (2004)
 Liveshow Thương hoài ngàn năm (2008)
 Liveshow Ngày không em (2008)
 Liveshow Sinh viên họ Đàm (2008)
 Liveshow Người tình (2010)
 Biển tình (2011)
 Liveshow Dạ tiệc trắng (2011)
 Liveshow Mr. Đàm By Night 5 – Bước chân miền Trung (2011)
 Liveshow Số phận (2012)
 Liveshow Thương hoài ngàn năm 2 (2015)
 Yêu em trong cả giấc mơ (2015)
 Diamond Show (2017)
 Liveshow Sài Gòn Bolero và Hưng (2017)

Music shows 

 Trái tim hát (2003)
 Giờ H (17, 18, 19 December 2004)
 Thương hoài ngàn năm (2007)
 Dạ tiệc trắng (2008)
 Người tình (2009)
 Vũ khúc mùa đông (2010)
 Mr. Đàm by night (2011)
 Số phận – kỷ niệm 15 năm ca hát (2012)
 Thương hoài ngàn năm 2 (2014)
 Diamond Show (2016)
 Sài Gòn Bolero và Hưng (2017)

Reality shows 

 The Voice Vietnam season 1, 2, 3 (Giọng hát Việt mùa 1, 2, 3) (2012, 2013, 2015)
 The X-Factor (Nhân tố bí ẩn) (2014)
 Fantastic Duo – Golden Couple season 1, 2, 3 (Tuyệt đỉnh song ca – Cặp đôi vàng mùa 1, 2, 3) (2016, 2017, 2018)
 Bolero Idol (Thần tượng Bolero) (2017)
 Undefeatable Voice (Giọng ca bất bại) (2018)
 Your Face Look Familiar season 6 (Gương mặt thân quen) (mùa thứ sáu) (2018)

Awards 

 1996: Incentive Prize of Bai Ca Thang 4 Contest by Dam Sen Theme Park.
 1997: First Prize of Semi Professional Voice Festival.
 1998: Fourth Prize of Ho Chi Minh City's The Star of Television Voice.
 1999: Being one of ten potential singers of Saigon Ballad Music Center.
 2001: First Prize of Saturday Afternoon for The Students show.
 2002: Green Wave Award of Ho Chi Minh City's Voice of Citizen Broadcast Station. 
 2003: Platinum Star – Best Male Singer Award.
 2004: Green Wave Award: Favorite Artist of 2004. 
 2005: Maple Leaf Award from The Consulate of Canada.
 2005: Two Green Wave Awards: Favorite Artist and Artist of the Year (2005).
 2006: Platinum Star: Most Impressive Styled Artist. 
 2007: Music Dedication 2007: Best Singer of 2007.
 2008: Two Green Wave Awards: 10 Favorite Singers and Singer of the Year. Silver Medal for ballad and folk song from Asean Voice Festival 2008.
 2010: Five Awards from Zing Music Awards 2010 and Favorite Singer of HTV Awards.
 2011: HTV Awards: Favorite Singer Award (2nd time).
 2013: Favorite Song Award: Chiec Vong Cau Hon (composed by Tran Tien).

Controversies

Wrong songs 
In his Vol. 8 album, Tình Ca Hoài Niệm (also known as Tình Ca 50) including love songs from 1954 to 1975, Phố Đêm (Night Town) was also one of the chosen songs in the album, on the cover it was said to be one of Nguyen Tuan Kiet's songs, however the song in the album was another song with same title from songwriter Tam Anh, that song was banned due to be thought as songs from old regime before 1975. He explained that he had badly misunderstood, but still got 30 million Vietnam Dong fine, the production company was fined 23 million Vietnamdong and the album was withdrawn from the shelf.

In the album Mr. Dam (2005), the song Em Đã Quên Một Dòng Sông was printed on the cover to be allegedly composed by songwriter Hai Trieu, actually this is a song by Vietnamese-American songwriter Truc Ho without his permission. Thuy Nga Center was the official representative for the release of this album, but Em Đã Quên Một Dòng Sông was cut out. Also in this album, Bạc Tình was a song by Vietnamese-American songwriter Huynh Nhat Tan, but it was printed to belong to songwriter Nhat Dang Khoa on the cover.

Feud with singer Phuong Thanh 
Before the news which singer Phương Thanh was blackmailed, he'd had a close friendship with Phuong Thanh. After this incident, Phuong Thanh came to meet him in person and said: "In this case, I only doubt Ngoc and Hung". Dam Vinh Hung also confirmed this news however he'd falsely assumed that Phuong Thanh was talking about singer Hong Ngoc and Tuan Hung.

In 2007, when the feud between Phuong Thanh and journalist Huong Tra was sent to the court, it was reported that Dam Vinh Hung sent his lawyer to assist Huong Tra.

In 2008, both admitted to haven't talked for more than 1 year. During this time, Phuong Thanh shared that there must be someone close to her, had sold out her personal life to the press to write many tabloids regarding her life. Other than that, the news about Dam Vinh Hung were published at the same time of Phuong Thanh's saying constantly added more tensions to their friendship.

Answering many speculations, he addressed that there were only misunderstanding and hopefully everything would be rightfully revealed. However, Phuong Thanh accused that the friendship "was doomed". In Green Waves Award 2012, they made it up.

Attack in America (2010) 
18 July 2010, he was attacked by Lý Tống while performing at Santa Clara Conference Center, California, USA. Afterward, middle aged and elder audiences didn't approve his appearance at the music show, there were protests and many plans put out to pressure the organizers to cancel any show that Dam Ving Hung involved.

According to Mercurynews, many supported Lý Tống, even local politicians, demanded to release him immediately. Lý Buồi hoped that the jury wouldn't accuse him of having violent intention, based on his excuse as he "protected Vietnamese community from the representative of the Communist regime". However, he was still accused of being guilty and had to serve 6 months in jail and another 3 years under control.

The incident which Dam Vinh Hung was heavily protested by Vietnamese Community in the US due to they viewed him as someone who propagandizes the Government of Vietnam. He was previously honored by the Government of Vietnam for performing multiple political songs while waving Vietnam national flag which happened to be hated by American-Vietnamese. Moreover, his statement for Lý Buồi as "I'm willing to forgive" was considered to be provocative.

Feud with Thanh Lam 
Singer Thanh Lam negatively commented on how Dam Vinh Hung and Ho Ngoc Ha were the judges of The Voice Vietnam 2012: "While watching The Voice, I was surprised and couldn't imagine myself that Dam Vinh Hung, Ho Ngoc Ha would be the judge, what are they going to teach the contestants though?". On 21 August 2012, he declared: "I'm not fake, neither pretending nor keeping silence on the matter. If you know how important your image is then everyone else does. Please end this relationship immediately. Stop meeting each other from now on". Thanh Lam and Dam Vinh Hung later due to conflicts had been avoiding each other ever since although they perform on the same stage. Previously, he had often stated that Thanh Lam was his idol.

Kissing a monk in 2012 
During the auction as a contribution for charity foundation for Wanbi Tuan Anh at Khong Ten Music Tearoom on 4 November 2012, he brought a bottle of wine on stage for auctioning along the declaration: The winner will bring the bottle of wine home and my two kisses". As the result, the winner was two monks for auctioning the bottle of wine for 55 million Vietnamdong.

Afterward, he kissed one of two monks on the lips and kissed the hand of the older monk. The monks later were fined from the higher monks for 3 months under control. The younger monk who kissed Dam Vinh Hung on the lip later deconsecrated due to family circumstance and his will was accepted.

In the letter to the press in 9 November, Dam Vinh Hung sent an apology to the audiences and monks. On 14 November 2012, the inspector of Vietnam's bureau of culture, sport and tourism invited him to Ha Noi for reporting, then fined him for 5 million Vietnam Dong for hi previous action toward the monk which was considered to be offensive. Later, another letter from Dam Vinh Hung allegedly, he revealed that the monk was the one who wanted to do the kiss and some negative accusations about this monk.

However, after deconsecration, the monk stated that Dam Vinh Hung was the one who ignited it and denied all the false accusations from Dam Vinh Hung.

Porridge business 
His company (appear to be Joint Stock Company Song Kim) lost a law court for the trading of the brand "Chao Cay Thi". Therefore, the company must return 1,5 billion Vietnam Dong for the trading previously. Up to now, his business didn't gain much success.

Incident with songwriter-composer Nguyen Anh 9 (2013) 
In August 2013, during an interview, composer Nguyen Anh 9 frankly commented on Dam Vinh Hung as he stated that: "His voice is half Southern-half Northern, he has no techniques and style in singing whatsoever. In the past, he could only be C list singer as a backup singer, not the main singer of tearooms at all"

"Dam Vinh Hung only own polished outside, I don't consider him as a true singer" (Nguyen Anh 9)

Artist Tran Hieu said: "We need someone to wake up everyone on the reality of Vietnam music industry nowadays like composer Nguyen Anh 9. If we keep complimenting this and that singer then Vietnam music industry will be hollow".

For those comments, he also gave an aggressive flashback on his Facebook page, in which he assumed composer Nguyen Anh 9 was only a person wearing a mask, that the composer's comment was offensive towards his achievement throughout the years as well as his fans.

"I promise you that from now on, I will never sing any of your songs although you had never said anything like the statement in the interview "please don't perform my songs" (Dam Vinh Hung).

The statement was considered to be "ungraceful" and provoked disapproval from other artists and the press. Many readers said that his behavior is impolite.

Composer Nguyen Anh 9 on the other hand, felt funny when reading Hung's letter, as he replied: "If you want to fight back, you need to be polite first".

The incident at General Vo Nguyen Giap's funeral 
On 6 October 2013, instead of queuing to visit General Vo Nguyen Giap's funeral, he and his assistant entered the funeral zone without queuing like others. He got the privilege to visit first in the surprise of many military veterans and Vietnam citizens.

Answering the journalist of Dat Viet Newspaper, the security guard at the funeral said that: "Before the visit, he had already called for permission".

Singles 
On 18 April 2012, Dam released his first single – Tuoi Hong Tho Ngay.

The uniqueness in the products of Mr. Dam is out of a record-length 16 min 45 sec, music video "Tuoi Hong Tho Ngay" is more like a short film with the complete story.

Tuoi Hong Tho Ngay is the song has story behind the writing is quite thrilling and until now, the real story of the death of the student Thai Tuan (Dương Triệu Vũ, who is the author of the lyrics of this song) sowing his suicide 4th floor of the dormitory from Hanoi Polytechnic University after love split is still a mystery, unknown to damage to those who love this song.

According to Students Polytechnic University was dazed with sudden death the student. Thai Tuan's friend had found the poem and because NS Thanh Tung knew so thanks to music songwriter. One year later, this friend has encountered unexpected accidents and cerebral palsy since then. Also this year, in a ceremony in memory friend has died, a male friend (Đàm Vĩnh Hưng's guitar) and female singing has rendered Tuoi Hong Tho Ngay. That evening, the both of friend have already encountered unexpected accident...

Temporarily called the film, this film is set back in Dalat, based on the contents of the above anecdote to variations. At first look it seems Mr Dam saw horned calves do not want to see it, but that scene, camera angles and actors considered beautiful new linger until the last minute. Perhaps stories like this coincidence in life is not rare, but not quite as much. Starring in which all the familiar faces.

Tuoi Hong Tho Ngay – completely unknown before this post. Now see or hear and read anecdotes that its new emotions, perhaps because to contemplate the scenario of character and storytelling to Dam Vinh Hung songs convey a feeling. Several months before the report also found this flurry of Mr Dam's music video but did not bother to read because not care. Movie only just short, but the scenes footage and interviews also quite fun and interesting. All invited actress, singer, model famous play, very nice clip, it is true that different people have money. Like her petite female face, the wedding scene was spectacular, color up as some promotional clips. Older male childhood he so cute, the boy play many movie should look familiar face, background music and also lead. Generally rated 8/10 on the whole.

Albums 
 Tình Ơi Xin Ngủ Yên (1998)
 Bình Minh Sẽ Mang Em Đi (2001)
 1 Trái Tim Tình Si (2002)
 Bao Giờ Người Trở Lại – Hãy Đến Đây Đêm Nay (2002)
 Phôi Pha – Tình Khúc Trịnh Công Sơn (2002)
 Cô Đơn Tiếng Sóng (2002)
 Màu Tóc Nhung – Ft. Mỹ Tâm (2002)
 Giọt Nước Mắt Cho Đời (2003)
 Hưng (2004)
 Tình Yêu Còn Đâu (2004)
 Mắt Lệ Cho Người – Ft. Ft. Mỹ Tâm, Quang Dũng (2004)
 Đàm 7 "Mr. Đàm" (2005)
 Tình Khúc Nguyễn Nhất Huy – Vẫn Nợ Cuộc Đời – Ft. Mỹ Tâm (2005)
 Hoa Học Trò (2005)
 Tình Ca Hoài Niệm (2006)
 Giải Thoát (2006)
 Tình Tuyệt Vọng (2006)
 Vùng Trời Bình Yên (2006)
 Xin Lỗi Tình Yêu (2007)
 Giã Từ (2007)
 Lạc Mất Em (2007)
 Hạnh Phúc Lang Thang – Dạ Khúc Cho Tình Nhân (2007)
 Hạnh Phúc Lang Thang 2 – Dạ Khúc Cho Tình Nhân (2007)
 Dạ Khúc Cho Tình Nhân 1 (2007)
 Những Bài Hát Chọn Lọc (2007)
 Bước Chân Mùa Xuân (2008)
 Mùa Noel Đó (2008)
 Muộn (2008)
 Hạnh Phúc Cuối (2008)
 Qua Cơn Mê – Dạ Khúc Cho Tình Nhân 2 (2008)
 Nửa Vầng Trăng (2009)
 Khoảng Cách (2010)
 Những Bài Ca Không Quên – Dạ Khúc Cho Tình Nhân 3 (2011)
 Cuộc Tình Đã Mất – Dạ Khúc Cho Tình Nhân 4 (2011)
 3H (2011)
 Sa Mạc Tình Yêu – Ft. Thanh Lam (2011)
 Xót Xa – Dạ Khúc Cho Tình Nhân 5 (2011)
 Anh Còn Nợ Em (2011)
 Tuyển Chọn Dạ Khúc Cho Tình Nhân (2011)
 Ca Dao Mẹ (2011)
 Chúc Xuân – Bên Em Mùa Xuân – Ft. Dương Triệu Vũ, Tammy Nguyễn, Hoài Lâm, Hồng Ngọc (2012)
 Số Phận (2012)
 Góc Khuất (2012)
 Giọng Hát Việt: That's How We Do It! – Ft. Hồ Ngọc Hà, Bức Tường, Thu Minh (2012)
 Đừng Yêu Anh – Ft. Tinna Tình (Single 2012)
 Thương Hoài Ngàn Năm (2012)
 Xóa Tên Người Tình & Chờ Đông – Dạ Khúc Cho Tình Nhân 6 & 7 (2013)
 Chiếc Vòng Cầu Hôn (2013)
 Tình Buồn Của H (2014)
 Cháy Cùng Em – Ft. Đức Thuận (2014)
 Làm Sao Anh Biết (2014)

Single 
 Tuổi Hồng Thơ Ngây (2012)
 Góc Khuất (2012)
 Ô Kìa...  (2014)

Tours – Live show

Awards

References

External links 

"‘Lady’ in red pepper sprays Mr. Dam in California ", Thanh Nien, 	 23 July 2010.

1971 births
Living people
21st-century Vietnamese male singers